The İnciraltı Sea Museum is a naval museum in the İnciraltı neighborhood of Izmir's Balçova district in Turkey. Located near the İnciraltı Ozdilek Shopping Center, it was opened on July 1, 2007.

Main attractions of the museum are two decommissioned naval vessels of the Turkish Navy, the submarine  (the former ) and the frigate  (the former ). There are also other exhibits at the museum.

References

External links
 Brief description of the museum provided by Anatolia News Agency

Museums in İzmir
Military in İzmir Province
Naval museums in Turkey
Museums established in 2007
Military and war museums in Turkey
Transport museums in Turkey
Balçova
Gulf of İzmir